The World's Famous Supreme Team was an American hip hop radio show duo and recording group active from 1979. The original members were Sedivine the Mastermind (Larry Price) and Just Allah the Superstar (Ronald Larkins Jr.).

Career
The group's radio show started in 1979 on WHBI-FM 105.9, broadcasting from Newark, New Jersey and primarily serving the North Jersey and New York City area. In a 2007 interview, Sedivine described the radio station as "a little rat trap, not a big station," and said the group paid WHBI between $150 and $300 for each one-hour show.

The group rose to international prominence when punk impresario Malcolm McLaren recruited Sedevine, Just Allah, and samples of their radio show (including their use of the then-novel scratching technique) for his 1982 hip hop song "Buffalo Gals". In 1983 the group and their radio samples were featured on McLaren's full album follow-up Duck Rock. The group is credited as the first hip hop group to incorporate Five Percent teachings and slang into their music. The group released their own single in collaboration with McLaren Hey DJ in 1984, produced by Stephen Hague, and which would later appear on their only album, Rappin''' (1986). McLaren reunited with the group for the 1990 album Round the Outside! Round the Outside!''. A compilation album of the group's music, featuring recording artists KRS-1, De La Soul, and Rakim, was released in 1998 on Virgin Records.

Discography

Albums

Singles

References

External links
 World's Famous Supreme Team Discography at Discogs.
 The World's Famous Supreme Team web site

American hip hop groups
Island Records artists
Virgin Records artists
Charisma Records artists
Five percenters